The 1960–61 Liga Bet season saw Hapoel HaMechonit,  Beitar Netanya, Maccabi Ramla and SK Nes Tziona win their regional divisions, and qualify for promotion play-offs. Beitar Netanya and Maccabi Ramla won the promotion play-offs and promoted to Liga Alef.

North Division A

North Division B

South Division A

South Division B

Promotion play-offs
A promotion play-off was played between the two winners of the North divisions, and another promotion play-off was played between the two winners of the South divisions. the play-offs format was of two legs, with a decisive match played in neutral venue, if two teams are level. the play-off winners set to be promoted to Liga Alef.

North play-off

Beitar Netanya promoted to Liga Alef.

South play-off

Maccabi Ramla promoted to Liga Alef.

References
The struggle in Liga Bet is tough - But pointless (Page 3) Hadshot HaSport, 10.7.61, archive.football.co.il 
Ramla with "One leg" in Liga Alef (Page 4) Hadshot HaSport, 2.7.61, archive.football.co.il 
Ramla to Liga Alef - The crowd roared after the victory over Nes-Tziona (2:1) (Page 4) Hadshot HaSport, 9.7.61, archive.football.co.il 
Aharoni's hat-trick promoted Beitar Netanya to Liga Alef (Page 4) Hadshot HaSport, 16.7.61, archive.football.co.il 

Liga Bet seasons
Israel
3